Big Sky Brewing Company is a brewery and taproom located in Missoula, Montana. It is owned by three partners, Bjorn Nabozney, Neal Leathers, and Brad Robinson. It is Montana's largest brewery. It first opened its doors in 1995 on 120-A Hickory Street, but eventually moved to its current location at 5417 Trumpeter Way. The brewery features both seasonal and regular ales and has continued to function under the same owners for twenty-three years.

History 
Big Sky Brewery began when Neal Leathers and Brad Robinson moved to Missoula, Montana from Michigan in 1990. This is where they met their future business partner Bjorn Nabozney, a native Montanan. Brad and Neal began work on starting a brewery. Bjorn created a business plan while studying at the University of Montana for a brewery that put Brad and Neal's idea into perspective. Big Sky Brewing Company was founded shortly after this in 1995.

After raising capital, they purchased their original location at 120 Hickory Street Missoula, Montana, which spanned 7,000 square feet. Big Sky Brewing began brewing beer at their Hickory Street brewery in 1995. Big Sky Brewing's Hickory Street brewery was known as a "draft only" brewery, which means that they did not bottle beer at this establishment. With their eyes set on becoming a regional brewery, Big Sky Brewing planned on bottling beer, the Hickory Street location did not constitute enough room to add bottling production. After an arrangement, Big Sky Brewing began brewing beers at Portland Brewing Company for a few days each month. Portland Brewing also bottled and shipped Big Sky Brewing's beer to distributors. During this arrangement, Big Sky Brewing raised money and worked towards building a new brewery where they could bottle their own beer. Due to this plan they were forced outside of Missoula in 2002 to their current location at 5417 Trumpeter Way, which is over 24,000 square feet. At this new building they bottle and brew their own beer, and their current production rate is around 40,000-47,000 barrels. With their production moving at full speed, they now employ over forty-five full-time employees and sell beer in twenty-four different states. In 2017, Big Sky Brewing lobbied the Montana Legislature, helping pass Montana House Bill 541 allowing breweries to produce 60,000 barrels of beer. Big Sky Brewing also built an amphitheater, where they hold charity events and concerts, in an effort to give back to the Missoula community.

Products  
 Biere de Noel
 Big Sky IPA
 Camp Robber
 Ivan the Terrible
 Moose Drool 5.1% abv
 Pack Train
 Powder Hound
 Scape Goat 5% abv
 Shake a Day
 Slow Elk
 Space Goat
 Summer Honey
 Trout Slayer

See also
List of Montana Breweries
Other Breweries in Missoula, Montana
 Bayern Brewing, Inc.
 Kettle House Brewing Co.
 Draught Works

Taprooms only 
 Tamarack Brewing Company
 Flathead Lake Brewing Co.
 Portland Brewing Company

References

External links
Big Sky Brewing Company
Big Sky Brewing Company at Beeradvocate.com

Bibliography 
Bubnash, Kasey. "Missoula's Brewmasters." Montana Kaiman: The Last Best College News. October 6, 2015. Accessed March 11, 2018. http://www.montanakaimin.com/news/missoula-s-brewmasters/article_60abbcb4-6879-11e5-bc5e-9f85f0262a47.html

D.J. "Interview with Bjorn Nabozney as Big Sky Brewing Launches Griz Montana Lager ." Brew Public . September 14, 2017. Accessed March 11, 2018. https://brewpublic.com/beer-fundraiser/interview-with-bjorn-nabozney-as-big-sky-brewing-launches-griz-montana-lager/

Erickson, David. "UM partners with Big Sky Brewing to sell Griz-branded beer." Missoulian, August 28, 2017. Accessed March 11, 2018. http://missoulian.com/news/local/um-partners-with-big-sky-brewing-to-sell-griz-branded/article_f680978e-e27a-5b88-8929-25ab9a796d24.html.

King, Jon. "Big Sky Brewing, Anheuser-Busch Settle 'Hold My Beer And Watch This' Dispute." Newstalk. January 23, 2014. Accessed March 11, 2018. http://newstalkkgvo.com/big-sky-brewing-anheuser-busch-settle-hold-my-beer-and-watch-this-dispute/.

Newhouse, Ryan. Montana Beer: A Guide to Breweries in Big Sky Country. Charleston, SC: American Palate, 2013.

Companies based in Missoula, Montana
American beer brands
Beer brewing companies based in Montana
Companies established in 1995
1995 establishments in Montana